Albert HUBO is a humanoid robot, based on the HUBO, but with an animatronic head in the likeness of Albert Einstein. Introduced in 2005, Albert HUBO is the world's first walking humanoid robot with an android head. It was developed by Joon-Ho Oh of KAIST in conjunction with Hanson Robotics, who developed the head. Albert HUBO served as the ambassador of "DYNAMIC KOREA", an initiative by the government of South Korea to rebrand and promote its technology internationally. Albert HUBO is capable of making many facial expressions and interacting with people.

Albert HUBO is 1.37 m tall and weighs 57 kg. Its walking speed is 1.25 km per hour, walking cycle is 0.95 seconds per step, and stride is 32 cm per step. Albert HUBO runs on Windows XP and RTX.

References

External links
 HUBO Lab
 Hanson Robotics
 Movie of Albert Hubo

Bipedal humanoid robots
Robots of South Korea
2005 robots
Cultural depictions of Albert Einstein